Tess of the D'Urbervilles is a three-hour television serial made by London Weekend Television, first broadcast in 1998, adapted for television by Ted Whitehead and directed by Ian Sharp and starring Justine Waddell, based on Thomas Hardy's 1891 book Tess of the d'Urbervilles.

Production
This serial of Tess of the D'Urbervilles was co-produced by London Weekend Television in partnership with the Arts and Entertainment Network of the US, which at the time was beginning to rival PBS in part-funding and broadcasting high quality British productions.

Cast
Justine Waddell as Tess Durbeyfield
Jason Flemyng as Alec D'Urberville
Oliver Milburn as 	Angel Clare
John McEnery as Jack Durbeyfield
Lesley Dunlop as Joan Durbeyfield
Rosalind Knight as Mrs D'Urberville
Anthony O'Donnell as Crick
Christine Moore as Mrs Crick
Bryan Pringle as Kail
Debbie Chazen as Marian
Linda Armstrong as Car Darch
Hannah Waterman as Nancy
Charlotte Bellamy as Cissie
Candida Rundle as Izzy
Amanda Brewster as Retty
Russell Morgan as Boy with Wheelbarrow

References

External links
Tess of the D'Urbervilles at IMDb.com

1998 British television series debuts
1998 British television series endings
1990s British drama television series
1990s British television miniseries
Television series set in the 1870s
Films based on Tess of the d'Urbervilles
ITV television dramas
Television series by ITV Studios
London Weekend Television shows
English-language television shows
Television shows based on works by Thomas Hardy